Lénaïck Adam (19 February 1992) is a French politician of Renaissance (RE) who was a member of the National Assembly from 2018 until 2022, representing department of French Guiana.

Early life
Adam was born on 19 February 1992, in Saint-Laurent-du-Maroni. He graduated in 2011 and then entered the Paris Institute of Political Studies In 2013, at the end of the bachelor's degree, he spent a year at Mackenzie Presbyterian University (Brazil) to learn the language. In 2014, he entered a master's degree in finance and strategy at Sciences Po Paris, where he graduated in 2016.

In parallel with his studies, Adam held positions within his father's river freight transport company, Maroni Transports & Liaisons, while ensuring the management of two other companies, in river transport and in the promotion of real estate and investment.

Political career
From 2015, Adam worked as adviser to the assembly of French Guiana, elected in the section of Saint-Laurent-du-Maroni.

Member of the National Assembly
In the 2017 legislative elections, Adam was elected to represent French Guiana's 2nd constituency, with 50.22% of the vote in the second round with 50.22% of the vote. He is the youngest deputy in the history of French Guiana and the first Bushinengue elected at the French National Assembly.

His election was invalidated on 8 December 2017 by the Constitutional Council, due to the absence of assessors in two polling stations, resulting in the cancellation of the votes cast in them. Since the number 
of canceled ballots was greater than the difference of votes between the two candidates present in the second round, a by-election was organized Following the by-election, he was re-elected in March 2018.

In parliament, Adam has been a member of the Finance Committee since 2018. In addition to his committee assignments, he has since been part of the Assembly's bureau, under the leadership of successive presidents François de Rugy (2017-2018) and Richard Ferrand (since 2018). He is also a member of the French-Nigerian Parliamentary Friendship Group. Adam ran for parliament in the 2022 French legislative election, but was not elected.

Political positions
In July 2019, Adam decided not to align with his parliamentary group's majority and became one of 52 LREM members who abstained from a vote on the French ratification of the European Union’s Comprehensive Economic and Trade Agreement (CETA) with Canada.

In 2020, Adam went against his parliamentary group's majority and abstained from an important vote on a much discussed security bill drafted by his colleagues Alice Thourot and Jean-Michel Fauvergue that helps, among other measures, curtail the filming of police forces.

See also
 2017 French legislative election
 French Guiana's 2nd constituency
 2018 French Guiana's 2nd constituency by-election

References

1992 births
Living people
Deputies of the 15th National Assembly of the French Fifth Republic
La République En Marche! politicians
21st-century French politicians
Sciences Po alumni
People from Saint-Laurent-du-Maroni
Black French politicians
Ndyuka people
Members of Parliament for French Guiana